Kottayam is a municipal town in the Indian state of Kerala. Flanked by the Western Ghats on the east and the Vembanad Lake and paddy fields of Kuttanad on the west. It is the district headquarters of Kottayam district, located in south-west Kerala.

Kottayam is also referred to as "The City of Letters" as many of the first Malayalam daily newspapers, like Deepika, Malayala Manorama, and Mangalam, were started and are headquartered in Kottayam, as are a number of publishing houses.

Etymology
The royal palace of the Thekkumkur ruler was protected by a fort called Thaliyilkotta. It is believed that the name Kottayam is derived from a combination of the Malayalam words kotta which means fort (Thaliyilkotta) and akam which means inside. The combined form, Kottaykkakam (കോട്ടയ്ക്കകം), can be translated as "inside the fort".

History

Travancore rule (1753–1949)

By the early 19th century, Kottayam was ruled by the Kingdom of Travancore. Travancore became a Protectorate of Britain after a series of unfair treaties. In 1817, the Church Missionary Society established CMS College as the first Western-style college in Kerala. It was welcomed by the Travancore government to provide administrators for the public bureaucracy

Kottayam has played its role in all the political agitations of modern times. The ‘Malayali Memorial ‘ agitation may be said to have had its origin in Kottayam. The Malayali Memorial sought to secure better representation for educated Travancoreans in the Travancore civil service against persons from outside. The Memorial, which was presented to the Maharaja Sri Moolam Thirunal (1891) was drafted at a public meeting held in the Kottayam Public Library. The event marked the beginning of the modern political movement in the State.

It was here that the famous Vaikom Satyagraha (1924–25), an epic struggle for eradication of untouchability, took place. Scheduled castes and other backward classes in Travancore were denied not only entry into temples, but also access to temple roads. Vaikom, the seat of a celebrated Siva Temple, was the venue of the symbolic satyagraha. Due to these protests, the Maharaja Chithira Thirunal Balarama Varma issued the Temple Entry Proclamation in 1936.

Indian Rule (1949–present)
Kottayam became a revenue division of Travancore. A fifth division, Devikulam, existed for a short period but was later added to Kottayam. At the time of the integration of the State of Travancore and Cochin in 1949, these revenue divisions were redesignated as districts and the Diwan Peshkars gave way to district collectors, with the Kottayam district established in July 1949.

Geography 
It is situated in the basin of the Meenachil River and in the basin of the Vembanad backwaters, which are formed from several streams in the Western Ghats of the Idukki district. The city is situated near the inland estuary of Meenachil river where it empties into the Vembanad lake in Kumarakom. According to the division of places in Kerala based on altitudes, Kottayam is classified as a midland area. The general soil type is alluvial soil. The vegetation is mainly tropical evergreen and moist deciduous. Kottayam district is bordered by Pathanamthitta district on the south, Alappuzha district on the west, Ernakulam district on the north and Idukki district on the east.

Climate
Under the Köppen climate classification, Kottayam has a Tropical monsoon climate (Am). The climate in this district is moderate and pleasant. Kottayam's proximity to the equator results in little seasonal temperature variation, with moderate to high levels of humidity.

Demographics

Population
 India census, Kottayam Urban Agglomeration had a population of 172,878, while Kottayam district had a population of 1,974,551. The population of Kottayam municipality was 136,812. Males constituted 62% of the population and females 38%. Population growth in the district had a diminishing trend with a decadal population growth rate of 6.5% compared to 9.35% across the decade 1991–2000. Population growth in the municipality is due to migration for employment. Kottayam District is ranked first in literacy, with 95.9% literacy compared to 90.92% for Kerala State and 65.38% for India (2001 census).

Caste and religion

Scheduled Castes and Scheduled Tribes constituted 6.73% and 0.31% of the total population in Kottayam respectively.
19,739 persons were engaged in work or business activity, including 14,282 males and 5,457 females. In the census survey, the worker is defined as a person who does business, job, service, cultivator or labour activity. Of total 19,739 working population, 90.17% were engaged in main work while 9.83% of total workers were engaged in marginal work.

Literature
Jnananikshepam was the first newspaper published by the natives of Kerala, published at CMS press at Kottayam in 1848. Kottayam has produced many well-known writers, journalists and artists. Writer and freedom fighter Vaikam Muhammad Basheer was born and brought up in a small village in Kottayam called Thalayolaparambu. Novelist Muttathu Varkey and poet Pala Narayanan Nair both have roots in Kottayam. Kottayam Pushpanath, a writer of crime thrillers lives in Kottayam. The Indian-English novelist Arundhati Roy is a native of Kottayam and her semi-autobiographical Booker Prize-winning novel, The God of Small Things, contains her childhood experiences in Aymanam, Kottayam. Unni R. a story writer and scriptwriter, is also from Kottayam. Kottayam Town is the first town in India to have achieved 100% literacy (a remarkable feat achieved as early as in 1989). English education in South India did actually start at the Old Seminary here at Kottayam in 1813.

Education
In the 17th century, a Dutch school was started at Kottayam, which was short-lived. The first English school in Kerala, and the first college in India, was established in 1817 by the Church Missionary Society of England as CMS College. Kottayam became India's first town with 100% literacy in 1989.

The Government Medical College, Kottayam, is one of the most prominent medical colleges in Kerala. Mahatma Gandhi University, Kerala, is based out of Kottayam. Kottayam boasts several other colleges and universities.

There are 14 engineering colleges. Government Engineering College, Rajiv Gandhi Institute of Technology, Kottayam is located in Pampady, 14 km east of Kottayam.

Media
In 1821, Benjamin Bailey, a British missionary, established C.M.S. Press, the first printing press in Kerala, in Kottayam. The town has been at the forefront of newspaper and book publishing in the state ever since.

Newspaper Malayala Manorama, published from Kottayam, is one of the largest circulating dailies in India. The Malayala Manorama Group, based in Kottayam, also owns Manorama Online, Manorama News Channel, The Week magazine and other publications. Other major Malayalam newspapers—Mathrubhoomi, Deshabhimani, Deepika, Madhyamam, and around thirty periodicals are published from Kottayam. Kottayam is also home to several Malayalam book publishers such as D. C. Books, Labour India Publications and Current Books. Almost 70 percent of books published in Kerala are from Kottayam. In 1945, a group of writers set up Sahithya Pravarthaka Sahakarana Sangham (English: Literary Workers' Co-operative Society) in Malayalam.

Sports
A number of annual basketball tournaments including the Marian Trophy, Girideepam Trophy, Lourdes Trophy and Virginia Memorial Tournament are conducted. The main sports stadiums in Kottayam are Nehru Stadium and Rajiv Gandhi Indoor Stadium, both located in Nagambadom.

Governance

Legislature
Kottayam is one of the six municipalities in the district, formed after the implementation of the Kerala Municipalities Act in 1994. The members of the municipal council are elected from each of 52 wards every five years, held with the local government elections across the state. The chairperson is the executive authority of the municipality.

Kottayam town is the part of the Kottayam legislative assembly constituency and the Kottayam Lok Sabha constituency. The legislative assembly election is conducted every four years, last in May 2016.

Executive

The collectorate of the Kottayam District is located in Kottayam town. The present collector is Dr. P. K. Jayasree IAS. Many administrative and district offices of Kottayam including the District Court is situated within the collectorate premises.

Judiciary
Five courts were established during the tenure of Colonel John Munro, as the Diwan of various states in India. One of these was established in Vaikom, in the northwest of Kottaya district.

The district court at Kottayam was established in 1910 during the period of Sree Moolam Thirunal Maharaja of Tranvancore. The court celebrated its centenary in 2010.

The District Headquarters of the judiciary is set up at Kottayam town with the Principal District Court as it Administrative Centre. The justice delivery system consists of eight Munsiff Courts, ten Judicial 1st Class Magistrate Courts, three Sub Courts, one Chief Judicial Magistrate Court, and three Additional District Courts. In addition to these regular courts, two Motor Accidents Claims Tribunals, one special court for Vigilance cases and two Family Courts also function in this district.

Politics

The major political parties active in Kottayam are Indian National Congress (INC), Communist Party of India (Marxist) (CPI[M]), Bharatiya Janata Party (BJP) and Kerala Congress. Trade union movements are also popular in Kottayam as Bharatiya Mazdoor Sangh (BMS, Indian Workers' Union), Indian National Trade Union Congress (INTUC) and Centre of Indian Trade Unions (CITU) affiliated workers engaged in the labor sector.

The current municipal chairperson is Bincy Sebastian. United Democratic Front (Kerala) (UDF[K]) is the ruling coalition of parties, holding a majority in the municipal council.

The current member of legislative assembly (MLA) from Kottayam is Thiruvanchoor Radhakrishnan. He has been of the member of legislative assembly of Kerala representing Kottayam town constituency since 2011.

Villages 
 

Chemmalamattam
Edayirikapuzha
Erattupetta
Kangazha
Kanjirappally

References

External links 

 Official website of Kottayam District
 Official website from Gov. of Kerala
 Britannica Reference on Kottayam
 Kottayam District Map, MapsOfIndia.com

 
Cities and towns in Kottayam district
Tourist attractions in Kottayam district
Kerala